The Dodge Avenger is a front-wheel drive, mid-sized sedan that was marketed by Dodge. The Avenger made its North American debut in 1994 for the 1995 model year as a coupe that was produced until 2000. The model name was reintroduced to the market as a four-door sports sedan starting in 2007 for the 2008 model year. 

The 2014 model year marked the end of Avenger production as the mid-sized models for both the Dodge and Chrysler brands were consolidated into the new Chrysler 200 introduced for the 2015 model year while Dodge received the new compact Dart.

Dodge Avenger Coupe (1995–2000)

Introduced as a two-door sedan but called a coupe in North America, the Dodge Avenger was built from 1994 until 2000 in a similar size and price class as the Dodge Daytona, which was discontinued in February 1993. 

The Avenger, along with the similar Chrysler Sebring sedan, was built by Diamond Star Motors (DSM), a joint venture between Chrysler Corporation and Mitsubishi Motors, on a version of the Mitsubishi Galant platform (which also spawned the similar Mitsubishi Eclipse). Chrysler sold its equity stake to Mitsubishi in 1993, and Diamond-Star Motors was renamed Mitsubishi Motors Manufacturing America (MMMA) on July 1, 1995. Avengers and Sebring coupes built from 1994 until 1996 both have DSM markings in their engine compartments.

The Avenger was built on a  wheelbase and used either a 2.0 L inline-four engine (the Chrysler 420A) or a Mitsubishi-designed 2.5 L V6. The four-cylinder was coupled to either a five-speed manual transmission, shared with the Mitsubishi Eclipse and Eagle Talon, or a four-speed automatic. The V6 engine was only available with the A604 automatic transmission. The Avengers featured a fully independent double wishbone suspension and variable-speed rack-and-pinion steering.

Trims included the Highline base model (V6 among other options made standard in 2000) and the ES.

Model year changes

1995
A DOHC 16-valve 2.0 L I4 engine (140 hp,  of torque) is standard. A SOHC 24-valve 2.5 L V6 engine and an automatic transmission (155 hp,  of torque) are made optional on the ES. Fog lamps and ABS are optional on the ES.

1996
Power and torque ratings for the V6 are increased (163 horsepower, . torque), and the ES coupes had new seat fabric.

1997
Standard were 16-inch wheels and the license plate was moved from the decklid to the rear bumper. The front and rear fasciae were redesigned. A Sport model was introduced (in addition to the base and ES). The Avenger Sport package consisted of exclusive 16-inch aluminum wheels and a body-color spoiler. This appearance package was available on the base model.

A body-color rear spoiler, P215/50HR17 tires, and 17-inch cast-aluminum wheels were added for the ES. The V6 is also standard for the ES, as well as rear disc brakes.

1998
An on-board recycling vapor recovery system, cafe latte exterior color, and a black and gray interior color combination are added.

1999
Next-generation driver and front passenger airbags are added, as well as a new exterior color: Shark Blue. The V6 engine and automatic transmission are standard on all models in mid-year, as well as several options. An antilock braking system (ABS) was used in all ES models until 1999.

2000
In 2000, the V6 and automatic transmission combination were made standard on all Avengers, and ABS was made an "option" for ES models. The four-cylinder engine was no longer available. Standard features that had previously been optional included power windows and locks. Base models added cruise control and 4-wheel disc brakes. The ES coupes now come with standard leather upholstery, keyless remote entry, and a power driver's seat.

Replacement
The coupe did not achieve high sales numbers, so in 2000, the Avenger was discontinued. It was replaced by the Dodge Stratus coupe for 2001. This model was also made at the former Diamond Star plant by Mitsubishi, using the Eclipse platform and architecture, though the Stratus sedan was engineered and built by Chrysler.

Dodge Avenger sedan (2007–2014)

The Dodge Avenger nameplate was reused in February 2007 as a 2008 model year sedan to replace the Dodge Stratus, whose coupe version had replaced the original Avenger in 2001.

Like its Dodge Journey stablemate, the Avenger's exterior was styled by Chrysler's Ryan Nagode. The interior was styled by Ben S. Chang.

The Avenger was officially unveiled at the Paris Motor Show on September 28, 2006, as a concept car. It was launched in Europe and was sold in the United Kingdom, filling a gap in the Chrysler range that was left by the Neon's demise four years earlier. It was also launched in Australia, although with only the 2.4 L engine. The Avenger was discontinued in that market in 2010 due to slow sales. The 2007-2014 models were sold in New Zealand.

In the US, the Avenger was launched with a 30-second television advertisement, "Tuned Up", that debuted Sunday, March 4, 2007, during NHL hockey, an ad in which a lab technician discovers he can play "Smoke on the Water" by Deep Purple on the Avenger's transmission. Another television spot likened the Avenger to the "superhero" vehicle for the everyman, depicting a driver piloting his Avenger through Gotham-like streets and alleys, speaking to the MyGig entertainment system in distinctly Batman-reminiscent tones, to arrive home, pull into a two-car garage, and open the rear door to a sleeping child in the rear car seat.

According to some reports, the Avenger, along with the redesigned Chrysler Sebring, shares a DaimlerChrysler/Mitsubishi Motors platform called JS, which used the Mitsubishi GS as a starting point. The base engine in the SE and SXT trim levels were the 2.4 L GEMA I4 naturally aspirated "World Engine", a joint venture between DaimlerChrysler, Mitsubishi, and Hyundai. Additional engines included an optional 2.7 L V6 in the SXT and a standard 3.5 L V6 in the R/T trim level. In addition to the 2.4 L World Engine and the V6s, export vehicles were offered with the 2.0 L naturally aspirated World Engine, as well as a 2.0 L turbocharged diesel (Pumpe-Düse) made by Volkswagen. As a 2008 model, the Dodge Avenger came to showrooms in February 2007.

Features on the new Avenger included optional heated/cooled cup holders and Dodge's new "Chill Zone", a feature that comes standard on all Avenger models, which can store up to four 12-US-fl oz cans in the glove box and chill them to 40°F.

The Avenger competed directly with the Chevrolet Malibu and Ford Fusion, with the 2007 and later Chrysler Sebring being aimed at the higher-priced American cars such as the Mercury Milan, Pontiac G6, and Saturn Aura.

2009
In the 2009 model year, like its Caliber, Charger, Grand Caravan, Journey, and Nitro models, the "AVENGER" badge at the trunk lid's left was repositioned to the right side to make way for "DODGE" at the left.

Following Fiat's takeover of Chrysler Group, marketing of the Avenger was discontinued in the United Kingdom, but sales continued in the Republic of Ireland and Western Europe until late 2009. This new version continued with SE and SXT trim levels and is not badged the same way as North American or the South American versions, although sales continued there until late 2009 following Fiat's takeover of Chrysler Group.

2011

For the 2011 model year, the Avenger received its first major overhaul since its 2008 reintroduction. Exterior changes include slightly revised sheet metal with a new crosshair grille displaying the new Dodge logo on the lower right corner of the grille, a sleeker bumper cut design, and standard LED combination taillights. Changes to the interior are more noticeable with a completely redesigned dashboard and instrument panel featuring an available 6.5-inch navigation/media center screen. Higher-quality soft-touch plastics for dashboard, door, and trim panels replace the old materials, which were criticized for their poor fit and finish quality, as well as being unpleasant to the touch. The seats receive better cushioning and higher-grade upholstery. Two-tone interior color combinations were available.

Mechanically, the 2011 Avenger came standard with the existing  2.4 L GEMA I4, although it was now paired with a six-speed automatic, as well as the option of the previous four-speed. The suspension was revised to improve handling and ride quality. Trim level designations were replaced by Express, Mainstreet, Lux, and Heat models.

The Dodge Avenger was ranked the "Most American Made" sedan by the American University's Kogod School of Business 2013 Made in America Auto Index. The Dodge Avenger also has an overall rating of 6.7.

Trims

SE: (2007–2009, 2012–2013) The "base" trim level from 2007-2009, and then again from 2012-2013.
2.4 L GEMA I4 DOHC 16V Dual VVT 4-speed automatic
SXT: (2007–2010, 2012–2013) The "volume" trim level from 2007-2010, and again from 2012-2013.
2.4 L GEMA I4 DOHC 16V Dual VVT 4-speed automatic
2.7 L EER V6 DOHC 24-valve MPI 4-speed automatic
2.4 L GEMA I4 DOHC 16V Dual VVT 6-speed automatic
3.6L Pentastar
SXT Plus: (2012) One of the more "uplevel" trim levels in 2012. Discontinued after 2012.
3.6 L Pentastar V6 DOHC 24V MPI 6-speed automatic
R/T: (2007–2010, 2012–2013) At first the "top-of-the-line" trim level from 2007-2010, and then the "performance-oriented" trim level from 2012-2013. 
3.5 L EGF V6 24V MPI 6-speed automatic
3.6 L Pentastar V6 DOHC 24V MPI 6-speed automatic
R/T AWD: (2007–2009)
3.5 L EGF High Output V6 24V MPI 6-speed automatic
Express: (2010-2011) Replaces SE as basic trim level from 2010-2011. Discontinued after 2011.
2.4 L GEMA I4 DOHC 16V MPI 4-speed automatic
Mainstreet: (2011) Replaces SXT as one of the more "basic" trim levels in 2011, and then discontinued after 2011.
2.4 L GEMA I4 DOHC 16V MPI 6-speed automatic
Lux: (2011) Replaces SXT Plus as one of the "uplevel" trims in 2011, and then discontinued after 2011.
2.4 L GEMA I4 DOHC 16V MPI 6-speed automatic
3.6 L Pentastar V6 DOHC 24V MPI 6-speed automatic
Heat: (2011) Replaces SXT Plus as one of the "uplevel" trim levels in 2011, and then discontinued after 2011.
3.6 L Pentastar V6 DOHC 24V MPI 6-speed automatic

Total sales

Safety
The 2008 through 2013 Avenger, also sold as the Chrysler Sebring from 2008 until 2010, and the Chrysler 200 from 2011 through 2013, received an overall "Good" rating by the IIHS indicating no significant injuries. In the small overlap test, the car received an overall "Acceptable" rating due to marginal dummy kinematics and slight intrusion into the passenger compartment. In the side test, the Avenger earns a "Good" rating, however, rib fractures would be possible for the driver. In the roof strength evaluation, it earns a "Good" rating, as well as its head restraints and seats. 

The Avenger earned the "Top Safety Pick" award in 2010, 2011, 2012, and 2014 as well as earned the "Top Safety Pick+" award in 2013.

Discontinuation
The discontinuation of the Dodge Avenger was announced by the automaker in early 2014, along with the end of the Chrysler 200 convertible model. The final 2014 model year Avengers were produced during first quarter 2014.

Motorsport
The first-generation Dodge Avenger body style was widely used in the National Hot Rod Association and earned the most prominence driven by Darrell Alderman and Scott Geoffrion from 1994 until 2000 as the Dodge Boys. 

The coupe was used for the 1994 and 1995 incarnations of the International Race of Champions. Although Dodge was IROC's car of choice since 1990, Dodge dropped out of this racing series after the 1995 season.

Avenger sheet metal was also used on race cars by several ARCA race teams from 1995 until 2000.

The Avenger replaced the Charger as Dodge's car for the 2007 NASCAR Nextel Cup Season. It appeared in Dodge Avenger grille, headlights, and taillights as the standard "spec" Car of Tomorrow (CoT) model. It got its first win with former Formula One driver Juan Pablo Montoya in the 2007 Toyota/Save Mart 350 at the Infineon Raceway.

In 2008, the Dodge CoT appearance was changed back to the Charger model.

Notes

References

External links

 
 

Avenger
Front-wheel-drive vehicles
Police vehicles
Mid-size cars
Coupés
Sedans
Station wagons
2000s cars
2010s cars
Cars introduced in 1994
Partial zero-emissions vehicles
Sport compact cars